William James Boone  (July 7, 1879 – May 15, 1963) was an American football coach.  He served as the head football coach at Hillsdale College in Hillsdale, Michigan for one season in 1906, tallying a mark of 0–7 .

Boone played football under Amos Alonzo Stagg at the University of Chicago. He was the starting right halfback of the 1905 University of Chicago national championship team .

References

External links

1879 births
1963 deaths
American football halfbacks
Chicago Maroons football players
Hillsdale Chargers football coaches
Hillsdale College alumni